Mexico is a Canadian documentary television miniseries which aired on CBC Television in 1966.

Premise
This four-part documentary series was an economic and socio-political view of Mexico.

Scheduling
Half-hour episodes were broadcast on Mondays at 10:00 p.m. as follows:

 "Gunpowder And Guitars", describing Mexico's early history (25 April 1966)
 "I Used To Be An Indian", regarding the effects of Spanish rule on Mexico's aboriginal peoples (2 May 1966)
 "Fiesta of Bullets", about the nation's social and political challenges (9 May 1966)
 "The Lucky Ticket", comparing Canada and Mexico in the context of American relations (16 May 1966)

References

External links
 

CBC Television original programming
1966 Canadian television series debuts
1966 Canadian television series endings